Steel Against the Sky is a 1941 American comedy film directed by A. Edward Sutherland, written by Paul Gerard Smith, and starring Lloyd Nolan, Alexis Smith, Craig Stevens, Gene Lockhart, Edward Ellis and Walter Catlett. It was released by Warner Bros. on December 13, 1941.

Plot

Rocky and Pete Evans are following in their father's footsteps working on girders building a bridge for John Powers. Chuck, their brother, prefers using his brains over brawn in get rich quick schemes that usually fail. Chuck tries to interest Rocky in financing a plan by Professor Samson, who claims to have invented a new product called Samsonite, (named after him), which is as strong as steel and as flexible as rubber. Rocky is not interested in wasting his money. Chuck brings the Professor home and Pop Evans loans him $25. A lab is set up in the basement of the Evans home. 
Rocky is romantically interested in Helen Powers, the daughter of the bridge contractor, and invites her home for dinner. The three brothers humorously vie for the use of the bathroom before Helen arrives. Meanwhile, the Professor's experiments create small explosions at the Evans' house. Chuck is enchanted with Helen and decides to work on the bridge with Rocky as his boss. Rocky is attacked on the girders by a disgruntled employee and Chuck rescues him, thus, impressing Helen.
Completion of the job, on time, is threatened by an impending storm. Work begins around the clock. Rocky sees Chuck kissing Helen and is furious. The brothers fight. Pop is devastated by the rift between the boys, whom he has raised since he was widowed and disabled on the job. He blames Helen for toying with the feelings of the boys, when she goes to his house to explain. Helen tries to make amends by rejecting Chuck. The storm causes a problem on the bridge. Rocky and Pete climb the ice covered girders to attempt repairs. Pete slips and falls into the icy water. Rocky continues but also slips and is treacherously hanging by his safety belt. Chuck climbs the girders to rescue his brother and all is forgiven. Helen professes her love for Chuck and in the final scene they are married (They were married in real life for over 50 years.)

Cast 
 Lloyd Nolan as Rocky Evans
 Alexis Smith as Helen Powers
 Craig Stevens as Chuck Evans
 Gene Lockhart as John Powers
 Edward Ellis as Pop Evans
 Walter Catlett as Professor Sampson
 Howard Da Silva as Bugs 
 Edward Brophy as Pete Evans
 Jackie Gleason as Cliff (uncredited)
 Julie Bishop as Myrt

References

External links 
 
 
 
 

1941 films
Warner Bros. films
American comedy films
1941 comedy films
Films directed by A. Edward Sutherland
American black-and-white films
1940s English-language films
1940s American films